Centruropsis dorcadionoides is a species of beetle in the family Cerambycidae, and the only species in the genus Centruropsis. It was described by Pic in 1928.

References

Morimopsini
Beetles described in 1928